The Philippine Deposit Insurance Corporation (abbreviated as PDIC) is a  Philippine government-run deposit insurance fund. It was established on June 22, 1963, by Republic Act 3591. The primary function of PDIC is to protect small investors/depositors and build strong confidence in banking. PDIC receives guidance from the International Association of Deposit Insurers.

History

Establishment 
On June 22, 1963, PDIC was created through Republic Act 3591, which provided:

 Deposit insurance coverage for banks
 Maximum deposit insurance of P10,000 per depositor
 Maximum assessment rate of 1/12 of 1% assessable deposits per annum
 Voluntary insurance membership with PDIC
 Permanent deposit insurance fund at 5 million pesos
 Formation of a 3-member Board of Directors

1960s-1970s 
In 1969, membership to PDIC became compulsory for all banks through Republic Act 6037. In 1970, PDIC started collecting the maximum assessment rate of 1/18 of 1% of net assessable deposits per annum.

In the same year, the first payout was given to the Rural Bank of Nabua, authorized by the Board. On July 6, 1970, initially one claim agent was assigned to handle the payout, although a transfer deposit scheme with the Rural Bank of Rinconada was later arranged to facilitate claims payment.

In 1978, the maximum deposit insurance coverage was increased to 15,000 pesos per depositor, according to Presidential Decree 1451.

1980s 
In 1984, the maximum deposit insurance coverage was increased to P40,000 per depositor (Presidential Decree 1897).

Also in 1984, under Presidential Decree 1940, the following reforms were undertaken:

 PDIC made a preferred creditor over unsecured creditors
 Trust accounts excluded from insurance coverage
 Minimum assessment premium paid by banks set at P250

In 1988, the World Bank report on strengthening the financial sector was completed and recommended a greater role for PDIC in the supervising/examination of banks and in handling distressed banks. The World Bank recommended PDIC to be appointed mandatory receiver and liquidator of closed banks, and its financial and manpower resources reinforced. As a result, PDIC drafted an Institutional Strengthening Program laying the groundwork for an institutional/organizational restructuring to cope with the expanded function; setting of upgraded standards, hiring procedures and intensive training programs; and innovations in systems and procedures with emphasis on computerization and automation.

Later in 1989, liquidity pools were set up to contribute to the stability in the rural banking system by immediately addressing temporary liquidity requirements of rural banks. Under this scheme, rural banks contributed a portion of their liquid assets, which the Land Bank of the Philippines (LBP) matched. The funds were invested in high-yielding, risk-free government securities, which can be availed of by member rural banks in the event of liquidity crisis. PDIC also maintained a credit line in case more funds are needed. After four years, there were already 27 liquidity pools created composed of 429 rural banks.

1990s 
In the following year, PDIC joined a World Bank mission, with then Central Bank and Land Bank of the Philippines, that created the Countryside Financial Institutions Enhancement Program (CFIEP) aimed at transforming rural banks into formidable agents of countryside development. The program helped rural banks to reduce burden of debt to CB, raise capital, attain economies of scale and become more competitive in the banking system. CFIEP Module 1 provided for infusion of fresh equity from existing stockholders and new investors. Module 2 focused on incentives in enhancing capital, while Module 3 provided incentives for merging and consolidation.

Republic Act 7400 was enacted on April 13, 1992, amending Republic Act 3591, and providing, among other changes:

 Increased maximum deposit insurance coverage to P100,000 from P40,000
 Adjusted assessment rate to a maximum of 1/5 of 1 percent of total deposit liabilities
 Increased Permanent Insurance Fund to P3 billion from P2 billion
 Authority to conduct independent examination of banks
 Assumption of liabilities as an additional mode of financial assistance
 Mandated as receiver and liquidator of banks ordered closed by the Monetary Board
 Amendment to the composition of the Board, designating the Finance Secretary as Chairman, PDIC President as Vice-Chairman, Bangko Sentral ng Pilipinas Governor as member, and two representatives from the private sector.

Also in 1992, PDIC established an office building at 2228 Pasong Tamo Street, Makati City.

In 1996, innovations were adopted to facilitate claims payment, including:

 Approval of scheme allowing immediate payment of claims with balances not exceeding P500 after these are validated, instead of passing through the usual rigorous deposit examination
 Direct cash payment of deposit accounts with balances not exceeding P1,000
 Simplification of documentary requirements to support claims for accounts of deceased depositors with deposit balances not exceeding P5,000
 Establishment of emergency pay-out facility to enable PDIC to respond to humanitarian needs of depositors. The facility allows the PDIC President to approve payment of the actual amount of claims or P5,000, whichever is lower, even before the official start of the claims settlement operations in a closed bank. Said amount was subsequently increased up to the MDIC of P100,000.

2000s 
In 2004, the institution made amendments with the goal of protecting depositors from loss. Republic Act 9302, or the Amendments to the PDIC Charter, was passed into law. The amendments aimed to provide heightened depositor protection. Major provisions included:

 Increase in the maximum deposit insurance coverage to P250,000 from P100,000
 Restoration of PDIC's authority to examine banks with prior approval by the Monetary Board
 Continuing insurance coverage of banks
 Grant of financial assistance to distressed banks under systemic risk conditions
 Authority to investigate banks on frauds, irregularities, and anomalies based on complaints received and reports of bank examinations
 Enhancement of PDIC's receivership and liquidation authority

Single digit turnaround time in claims settlement operations from bank takeover was achieved for all banks closed during the year, with average turnaround time at 8 days.

PDIC, as liquidator, completed 78 final projects of distribution (POD) for closed banks. POD refers to the specific distribution plan of a closed bank's assets and is submitted to the Liquidation Court for approval.

Additional amendments took place in PDIC in 2009. The PDIC Charter was amended with the passage of Republic Act 9576 that took effect on June 1, 2009. The most significant provisions were:

 Increase in the maximum deposit insurance coverage from P250,000 to P500,000
 Grant of the flexibility to adjust the maximum deposit insurance coverage in case of a condition that threatens the monetary and financial stability of the banking system, subject to the approval by the President of the Philippines
 Grant of institutional and financial strengthening measures to mitigate moral hazard and beef up the Deposit Insurance Fund

During the year, the PDIC laid the foundation for new initiatives aimed at invigorating the banking sector, particularly rural banks, through the Strengthening Program for Rural Banks funded at P5 billion and the support program, the Investor-Investee Helpdesk.

The PDIC adopted the Corporate Governance Code and implemented the Citizen's Charter.

President Jose C. Nograles was elected to IADI's Executive Council.

References

External links
Philippine Deposit Insurance Corporation

Finance in the Philippines
Banks established in 1963
Deposit insurance
Department of Finance (Philippines)
Companies based in Makati
Philippine companies established in 1963